The chod rig is a fishing rig for carp fishing, generally regarded as having three main advantages: the way in which it allows a bait to be displayed over soft mud, weed or debris; and the way its distinct shape allows the chosen bait (usually a buoyant substance) to be attached. The latter benefit is also generally utilised in the chod rig's immediate ancestor, the stiff-hinged rig. It  revolves around a rig consisting of a rigid or stiff link, an aggressively angled hookpoint and the ability to spring 360 degrees around the axis of the hook. The third benefit is it makes carp fishing almost impossibly easy requiring little skill or effort for large rewards. The only requirement is to soak the baits for long enough until a carp finds it.

The chod rig is widely used and developed by large fishing manufacturers. Industry headliners such as Jim Shelley and Terry Hearn use the chod rig to great effect. Known carp such as Benson and Heather the Leather have been captured by the chod rig.

The two key features of the chod combine to make it very difficult for a carp to avoid the hook or physically dislodge it after being snared. The hookholds that the chod delivers are generally very strong and secure, causing less damage to the fish's mouth. Not only do very few fish fall off with this set-up, but they suffer minimal damage.

Sources 
 http://www.korda.co.uk/rigz/?id=10
 http://www.carp-fishing.org/Carp-Rigs/Chod-Rig-Carp-Fishing.htm
 https://web.archive.org/web/20120626131431/http://www.essex-fishing.co.uk/
 How to create and use the chod rig to catch fish
 Tying the chod right made simple
 How to tie a chod rig
 The Carp Rig Guide for Beginners
 The Chod Rig: How To Use It Correctly

Fishing techniques and methods